The Act of Succession of 27 March 1953 was adopted after a 1953 referendum in Denmark and dictates the rules governing the succession to the Danish throne. The 1953 referendum changed the act so that it became possible for a woman to inherit the throne if she has no older or younger brothers, a system known as male-preference cognatic preference primogeniture. As the reigning King Frederick IX had three daughters and no sons, this meant that Princess Margrethe became the heir presumptive instead of her uncle Prince Knud. As Frederick IX's wife Queen Ingrid was not expected to (and in fact did not) have any more children, this effectively ensured that Princess Margrethe would become Queen of Denmark, which she did. The act also removed the succession rights of minor members of the House of Glücksburg such as Prince Philip of Greece and Denmark and his descendants.

Following a referendum in 2009 the Act of Succession was amended so that primogeniture no longer puts males over females. In other words, the first-born child would become heir to the throne regardless of the child's sex. The expected result of the referendum was on the balance, since 40% of the entire electorate had to vote yes in order to make the change. However the succession amendment was confirmed by a larger turnout especially in rural areas. The change of the act had no effect on the actual line of succession at that time, but it does affect the current (as of 2018) line of succession: it puts Princess Isabella ahead of her younger brother Prince Vincent (who was born in the year 2011).

Notes

Law of Denmark
Succession acts
1953 in Denmark